Wright is an impact crater in the Phaethontis quadrangle of Mars, located at 58.9°S latitude and 151.0°W longitude. It measures  in diameter and was named after American astronomer William Hammond Wright (1871–1959). The naming was approved by the IAU in 1973. The Keeler–Trumpler crater pair lies to the south.

Gallery

See also 
 List of craters on Mars

References 

Phaethontis quadrangle
Impact craters on Mars